Oda Station, or Ōda Station is the name of four train stations in Japan:

 Ōda Station (Kumamoto) (網田駅)
 Ōda Station (Mie) (麻生田駅)
 Oda Station (Okayama) (小田駅)
 Oda Station (Shimane) (小田駅)